USS Naiwa (SP-3512), was a cargo ship of the United States Navy in commission from 1918 to 1919.

Construction, acquisition, and commissioning
Naiwa was laid down as the commercial cargo ship SS Naiwa by the Baltimore Shipbuilding and Drydock Company at Baltimore, Maryland, in 1918 for the United States Shipping Board. Launched on 4 July 1918, she was turned over to the U.S. Navy on 10 September 1918 and completed in October 1918. Assigned the naval registry identification number 3512, she was commissioned at Baltimore on 4 November 1918 as USS Naiwa (ID-3512).

Operational history
 
Naiwa was assigned to Naval Overseas Transportation Service on a United States Army account. After refitting for naval service, Naiwa cleared Baltimore Harbor on 27 November 1918 with a general cargo for France, but was forced to turn back because of jammed steering gear. Following extensive repairs in drydock, she steamed from Norfolk, Virginia, on 8 March 1919 to again attempt a transatlantic crossing, and this time arrived at La Pallice, France, on 23 March 1919. She then went on to Bordeaux, where she discharged her cargo.

Naiwa cleared Bordeaux on 12 April 1919 and steamed to Brest, where she took on a cargo of 7,130 tons of German guns and gun parts, then departed for Norfolk, Virginia. She arrived at Norfolk on 2 May 1919.

Decommissioning and disposal
Naiwa she was decommissioned on 9 May 1919 and returned to the U.S. Shipping Board the same day. She remained in the custody of the Shipping Board as SS Naiwa until she was scrapped in 1929.

References

Department of the Navy: Naval Historical Center Online Library of Selected Images: U.S. Navy Ships: USS Naiwa (ID # 3512), 1918-1919. Originally, and later, S.S. Naiwa (American Freighter, 1918).
NavSource Online: Section Patrol Craft Photo Archive: Naiwa (ID 3512)

External links
 Photo gallery at U.S. Navy History and Heritage Command

Auxiliary ships of the United States Navy
World War I cargo ships of the United States
Ships built in Baltimore
1918 ships